The birds-of-paradise are members of the family Paradisaeidae of the order Passeriformes. The majority of species are found in eastern Indonesia, Papua New Guinea and eastern Australia. The family has 45 species in 17 genera. The members of this family are perhaps best known for the plumage of the males of the  species, the majority of which are sexually dimorphic. The males of these species tend to have very long, elaborate feathers extending from the beak, wings, tail or head. For the most part they are confined to dense rainforest habitat. The diet of all species is dominated by fruit and to a lesser extent arthropods. The birds-of-paradise have a variety of breeding systems, ranging from monogamy to lek-type polygamy.

A number of species are threatened by hunting and habitat loss.

Taxonomy
The family Paradisaeidae was introduced (as Paradiseidae) in 1825 with Paradisaea as the type genus by the English naturalist William John Swainson. For many years the birds-of-paradise were treated as being closely related to the bowerbirds. Today while both are treated as being part of the Australasian lineage Corvida, the two are now thought to be only distantly related. The closest evolutionary relatives of the birds-of-paradise are the crow and jay family Corvidae, the monarch flycatchers Monarchidae and the Australian mudnesters Struthideidae.

A 2009 study examining the mitochondrial DNA of all species to examine the relationships within the family and to its nearest relatives estimated that the family emerged 24 million years ago, earlier than previous estimates. The study identified five clades within the family, and placed the split between the first clade, which contains the monogamous manucodes and paradise-crow, and all the other birds-of-paradise, to be 10 million years ago. The second clade includes the parotias and the King of Saxony bird-of-paradise. The third clade provisionally contains several genera, including Seleucidis, the Drepanornis sicklebills, Semioptera, Ptiloris and Lophorina, although some of these are questionable. The fourth clade includes the Epimachus sicklebills, Paradigalla and the astrapias. The final clade includes the Cicinnurus and the Paradisaea birds-of-paradise.

The exact limits of the family have been the subject of revision as well. The three species of satinbird (the genera Cnemophilus and Loboparadisea) were treated as a subfamily of the birds-of-paradise, Cnemophilinae. In spite of differences in the mouth, foot morphology and nesting habits they remained in the family until a 2000 study moved them to a separate family closer to the berrypeckers and longbills (Melanocharitidae). The same study found that the Macgregor's bird-of-paradise was actually a member of the large Australasian honeyeater family. In addition to these three species, a number of systematically enigmatic species and genera have been considered potential members of this family. The two species in the genus Melampitta, also from New Guinea, have been linked with the birds-of-paradise, but their relationships remain uncertain, more recently being linked with the Australian mudnesters. The silktail of Fiji has been linked with the birds-of-paradise many times since its discovery, but never formally assigned to the family. Recent molecular evidence now places the species with the fantails.

Phylogeny
A genus level phylogeny of the family has been determined by Martin Irestedt and collaborators.

Species 

genus: Lycocorax
Halmahera paradise-crow, Lycocorax pyrrhopterus
Obi paradise-crow, Lycocorax obiensis

genus: Manucodia
 Glossy-mantled manucode, Manucodia ater
 Tagula manucode, Manucodia alter
 Jobi manucode, Manucodia jobiensis
 Crinkle-collared manucode, Manucodia chalybatus
 Curl-crested manucode, Manucodia comrii

genus: Phonygammus
 Trumpet manucode, Phonygammus keraudrenii

genus: Paradigalla
 Long-tailed paradigalla, Paradigalla carunculata
 Short-tailed paradigalla, Paradigalla brevicauda

genus: Astrapia
 Arfak astrapia, Astrapia nigra
 Splendid astrapia, Astrapia splendidissima
 Ribbon-tailed astrapia, Astrapia mayeri
 Stephanie's astrapia, Astrapia stephaniae
 Huon astrapia, Astrapia rothschildi

genus: Parotia
 Western parotia, Parotia sefilata
 Carola's parotia, Parotia carolae
 Bronze parotia, Parotia berlepschi
 Lawes's parotia, Parotia lawesii
 Eastern parotia, Parotia helenae (Disputed)
 Wahnes's parotia, Parotia wahnesi

genus: Pteridophora
 King of Saxony bird-of-paradise, Pteridophora alberti

genus: Lophorina
 Greater lophorina, Lophorina superba
 Crescent-caped lophorina, Lophorina niedda
 Lesser lophorina, Lophorina minor 

genus: Ptiloris
 Magnificent riflebird, Ptiloris magnificus
 Growling riflebird, Ptiloris intercedens
 Paradise riflebird, Ptiloris paradiseus
 Victoria's riflebird, Ptiloris victoriae

genus: Epimachus
 Black sicklebill, Epimachus fastosus
 Brown sicklebill, Epimachus meyeri

genus: Drepanornis
 Black-billed sicklebill, Drepanornis albertisi
 Pale-billed sicklebill, Drepanornis bruijnii

genus: Cicinnurus
 King bird-of-paradise, Cicinnurus regius
 Magnificent bird-of-paradise, Cicinurrus magnificus/Diphyllodes magnificus
 Wilson's bird-of-paradise, Cicinnurus respublica/Diphyllodes respublica

genus: Diphyllodes
 Magnificent bird-of-paradise, Diphyllodes magnificus
 Wilson's bird-of-paradise, Diphyllodes respublica

genus: Semioptera
 Standardwing bird-of-paradise, Semioptera wallacii

genus: Seleucidis
 Twelve-wired bird-of-paradise, Seleucidis melanoleucus

genus: Paradisaea
 Lesser bird-of-paradise, Paradisaea minor
 Greater bird-of-paradise, Paradisaea apoda
 Raggiana bird-of-paradise, Paradisaea raggiana
 Goldie's bird-of-paradise, Paradisaea decora
 Red bird-of-paradise, Paradisaea rubra
 Emperor bird-of-paradise, Paradisaea guilielmi

genus: Paradisornis
 Blue bird-of-paradise, Paradisornis rudolphi

Hybrids

Hybrid birds-of-paradise may occur when individuals of different species, that look similar and have overlapping ranges, confuse each other for their own species and crossbreed.

When Erwin Stresemann realised that hybridisation among birds-of-paradise might be an explanation as to why so many of the described species were so rare, he examined many controversial specimens and, during the 1920s and 1930s, published several papers on his hypothesis. Many of the species described in the late 19th and early 20th centuries are now generally considered to be hybrids, though some are still subject to dispute; their status is not likely to be settled definitely without genetic examination of museum specimens, which will come soon in summer 2021 in North America, South America, Africa, Europe, Asia, and Australia, and some birds in an aviary in Central Park Zoo.

Description

Birds-of-paradise are closely related to the corvids. In most species, the tails of the males are larger and longer than the female, the differences ranging from slight to extreme. The wings are rounded and in some species structurally modified on the males in order to make sound. There is considerable variation in the family with regard to bill shape. Bills may be long and decurved, as in the sicklebills and riflebirds, or small and slim like the Astrapias. As with body size, bill size varies between the sexes, although species where the females have larger bills than the male are more common, particularly in the insect-eating species.

Plumage variation between the sexes is closely related to breeding system. The manucodes and paradise-crow, which are socially monogamous, are sexually monomorphic. So are the two species of Paradigalla, which are polygamous. All these species have generally black plumage with varying amounts of green and blue iridescence. The female plumage of the dimorphic species is typically drab to blend in with their habitat, unlike the bright attractive colours found on the males. Younger males of these species have female-like plumage, and sexual maturity takes a long time, with the full adult plumage not being obtained for up to seven years. This affords the younger males the protection from predators of more subdued colours, and also reduces hostility from adult males.

Distribution and habitat
The centre of bird-of-paradise diversity is the large island of New Guinea; all but two genera are found in New Guinea. Those other two are the monotypic genera Lycocorax and Semioptera, both of which are endemic to the Maluku Islands, to the west of New Guinea. Of the riflebirds in the genus Ptiloris, two are endemic to the coastal forests of eastern Australia, one occurs in both Australia and New Guinea, and one is only found in New Guinea. The only other genus to have a species outside New Guinea is Phonygammus, one representative of which is found in the extreme north of Queensland. The remaining species are restricted to New Guinea and some of the surrounding islands. Many species have very small ranges, particularly those with restricted habitat types such as mid-montane forest (like the black sicklebill) or island endemics (like the Wilson's bird-of-paradise).

The majority of birds-of-paradise live in tropical forests, including rainforest, swamps and moss forest, nearly all of them solitary tree dwellers. Several species have been recorded in coastal mangroves. The southernmost species, the paradise riflebird of Australia, lives in sub-tropical and temperate wet forests. As a group the manucodes are the most plastic in their habitat requirements; in particular, the glossy-mantled manucode, which inhabits both forest and open savanna woodland. Mid-montane habitats are the most commonly occupied habitat, with thirty of the forty species occurring in the 1000–2000 m altitudinal band.

Behaviour and ecology

Diet and feeding

The diet of the birds-of-paradise is dominated by fruit and arthropods, although small amounts of nectar and small vertebrates may also be taken. The ratio of the two food types varies by species, with fruit predominating in some species, and arthropods dominating the diet in others. The ratio of the two will affect other aspects of the behaviour of the species; for example, frugivorous species tend to feed in the forest canopy, whereas insectivores may feed lower down in the middle storey. Frugivores are more social than the insectivores, which are more solitary and territorial.

Even the birds-of-paradise that are primarily insect eaters will still take large amounts of fruit. The family is overall an important seed disperser for the forests of New Guinea, as they do not digest the seeds. Species that feed on fruit will range widely searching for fruit, and while they may join other fruit-eating species at a fruiting tree, they will not associate with them otherwise and will not stay with other species for long. Fruit are eaten while perched and not from the air, and birds-of-paradise are able to use their feet as tools to manipulate and hold their food, allowing them to extract certain capsular fruit. There is some niche differentiation in fruit choice by species and any one species will only consume a limited number of fruit types compared to the large choice available. For example, the trumpet manucode and crinkle-collared manucode will eat mostly figs, whereas the Lawes's parotia focuses mostly on berries and the greater lophorina and raggiana bird-of-paradise take mostly capsular fruit.

Breeding

Most species have elaborate mating rituals, with at least eight species exhibiting lek mating systems, including the genus Paradisaea. Others, such as the Cicinnurus and Parotia species, have highly ritualised mating dances. Across the family (Paradisaeidae), female preference is incredibly important in shaping the courtship behaviors of males and, in fact, drives the evolution of ornamental combinations of sound, color, and behavior. Males are polygamous in the sexually dimorphic species, but monogamous in at least some of the monomorphic species. Hybridisation is frequent in these birds, suggesting the polygamous species of bird of paradise are very closely related despite being in different genera. Many hybrids have been described as new species in the past, and doubt remains regarding whether some forms, such as Rothschild's lobe-billed bird-of-paradise, are valid.

Birds-of-paradise build their nests from soft materials, such as leaves, ferns, and vine tendrils, typically placed in a tree fork. The typical number of eggs in each clutch varies among the species and is not known for every species. For larger species, it is almost always just one egg, but smaller species may produce clutches of 2–3 eggs. Eggs hatch after 16–22 days, and the young leave the nest at between 16 and 30 days of age.

Relationship with humans

Societies of New Guinea often use bird-of-paradise plumes in their dress and rituals, and the plumes were popular in Europe in past centuries as adornment for ladies' millinery.  Hunting for plumes and habitat destruction have reduced some species to endangered status; habitat destruction due to deforestation is now the predominant threat.

Best known are the members of the genus Paradisaea, including the type species, the greater bird-of-paradise, Paradisaea apoda. This species was described from specimens brought back to Europe from trading expeditions in the early sixteenth century. These specimens had been prepared by native traders by removing their wings and feet so that they could be used as decorations. This was not known to the explorers, and in the absence of information many beliefs arose about them. They were briefly thought to be the mythical phoenix. The often footless and wingless condition of the skins led to the belief that the birds never landed but were kept permanently aloft by their plumes. The first Europeans to encounter their skins were the voyagers in Ferdinand Magellan's circumnavigation of the Earth. Antonio Pigafetta wrote that "The people told us that those birds came from the terrestrial paradise, and they call them bolon diuata, that is to say, 'birds of God'."  This is the origin of both the name "bird of paradise" and the specific name apoda – without feet. An alternate account by Maximilianus Transylvanus used the term Mamuco Diata, a variant of Manucodiata, which was used as a synonym for birds-of-paradise up to the 19th century.

Birdwatching
In recent years the availability of pictures and videos about birds of paradise in the internet has raised interest of birdwatchers around the world. Many of them fly to West Papua to watch various species of birds of paradise from Wilson's Bird of Paradise (Diphyllodes respublica) and Red Bird of Paradise (Paradisaea rubra) in Raja Ampat to Lesser Birds of Paradise (Paradisaea minor), Magnificent Riflebird (Ptiloris magnificus), King Bird of Paradise (Cicinnurus regius), crescent-caped lophorina (Lophorina niedda), and Magnificent Bird of Paradise (Diphyllodes magnificus) in Susnguakti forest.

This activity significantly reduces the number of local villagers who are involved in the hunting of paradise birds.

Hunting
Hunting of birds of paradise has occurred for a long time, possibly since the beginning of human settlement. It is a peculiarity that among the most frequently-hunted species, males start mating opportunistically even before they grow their ornamental plumage. This may be an adaptation maintaining population levels in the face of hunting pressures, which have probably been present for hundreds of years.

The naturalist, explorer and author Alfred Russel Wallace spent six years in the region, which he chronicled in The Malay Archipelago (published in 1869). His expedition team shot, collected and described many specimens of animals and birds, including the great, king, twelve-wired, superb, red and six-shafted birds of paradise.

Hunting to provide plumes for the millinery trade was extensive in the late 19th and early 20th century, but today the birds have legal protection except for hunting at a sustainable level to fulfill the ceremonial needs of the local tribal population. In the case of Pteridophora plumes, scavenging from old bowerbird bowers is encouraged.

Other examples
 The southern hemisphere constellation Apus represents a bird-of-paradise.
 An adult-plumaged male bird-of-paradise is depicted on the flag of Papua New Guinea, designed by Susan Karike.
 The various members of the family were profiled by David Attenborough in Attenborough in Paradise.
 The Indonesian Army has a Military Area Command named after "Cenderawasih", the local name for the bird.
 The plume from the bird of paradise was used in the Royal crown worn by the King of Nepal, before the establishment of a republic. Now, the crown is housed in Naraynhiti Palace Museum.

Specimen gallery

See also

Notes

References

Bibliography

External links

 Birds-of-Paradise Project website by the Cornell Lab of Ornithology 
 Bird-of-paradise videos and images on the Internet Bird Collection
 Birds-of-paradise infographic produced for National Geographic
 Birds-of-paradise from Papua New Guinea, PhotographyAxis
 

.
Taxa named by Nicholas Aylward Vigors